Devil's Due Publishing  (often abbreviated as DDP)  is an independent comic book publisher in the United States.  Based in Chicago, Illinois, DDP is best known for its wide selection of genres, including licensed and original creator-owned properties that populate its monthly comic book series and graphic novels.

Though principally a publishing company, DDP has also produced a stage play based on the Hack/Slash comic series, Stagefright, in conjunction with the New Millennium Theatre Company that played at the National Pastime Theater on Broadway, Chicago from September 23 to October 29, 2005.

History
In 1998 Devil's Due Publishing started as both a commercial art studio and a small press comic-book publisher. The company soon shifted its focus to comic books, becoming one of the top ten publishers in North America.

In 2004 Pat Broderick revived Micronauts at Devil's Due, although the title was cancelled after ten issues.

DDP produced an American comic book version of Vampire Hunter D. It was written by Jimmy Palmiotti and titled American Wasteland.

Devil's Due restructured itself in December 2008, including changes in editors, marketing managers, and a new CEO.

In 2009, Devil's Due was accused of not paying several creative teams. In an article on the website Bleeding Cool, Rich Johnston wrote to the company's CEO, Joshua Blaylock, and reported that only Tim Seeley had gone unpaid.

DDP is represented in Hollywood by Alter Ego Entertainment and Prime Universe, who share a first-look deal with the publisher for film, television and video games. Currently the three parties are in discussion with numerous studios about expanding Devil's Due properties into other media.

In 2010, DDP and Checker Book Publishing Group (owned and operated by Mark Thompson) opened Devil's Due Digital; a solely digital comic book and graphic novel distribution company.

On June 16, 2015, Devil’s Due Entertainment announced plans to merge with First Comics.

Comic series

Published

Published with other companies

Chaos! Comics
 Evil Ernie #1–4
 Purgatori #1–6

Dabel Bros.
 Hedge Knight #1–6

eigoMANGA
 Rumble Pak

Kinetic Komicz
 killer7 #½–4

Monkey Pharmacy
 Elsinore #4, 5
 Elsinore: Psycho Sanctii (unreleased)

Studio Ice
 Megacity 909 #1–8
 Mu #1–4

Udon
 Capcom Summer Special 2004
 Darkstalkers #1–5
 Street Fighter #1–14

Urban Robot
 Lo-Fi Magazine #1, 3
 Lo-Fi Magazine Vol. 2 #4–7

See also
Chaos! Comics

References

External links

Article about Devil's Due's recent business troubles

 
Publishing companies established in 1999
1999 establishments in Illinois
Comic book publishing companies of the United States
Companies based in Chicago